The Old Vestry Office is a grade II listed building at 22 The Town, Enfield, London. It was built around 1800 or 1830 as the town beadle's office. It was used as the town police station from 1840 to 1872 and contained two prison cells.

References

External links

Buildings and structures in the London Borough of Enfield
Grade II listed buildings in the London Borough of Enfield
Enfield, London